Carlos Luis Lorenzo Valdez (born December 26, 1971) is a former middle relief pitcher in Major League Baseball who played in part of two seasons for the San Francisco Giants and Boston Red Sox. He also played in Japan for the Kintetsu Buffaloes. Listed at 5' 11", 191 lb., he batted and threw right-handed. His older brother, Efrain Valdez, also pitched in the major leagues.

In 15 relief appearances, Valdez had a 1-1 record with a 5.00 ERA without saves, giving up 10 runs on 20 hits and 13 walks while striking out 11 in 18.0 innings of work. 
 
Valdez also played in the Giants and Red Sox minor league systems (1991–98), posting a 35-37 mark with 4.07 ERA and 16 saves in 267 games.

External links

1971 births
Living people
Albany-Colonie Diamond Dogs players
Boston Red Sox players
Dominican Republic expatriate baseball players in Japan
Dominican Republic expatriate baseball players in the United States

Major League Baseball pitchers
Major League Baseball players from the Dominican Republic
Nippon Professional Baseball pitchers
Osaka Kintetsu Buffaloes players
Pawtucket Red Sox players
San Francisco Giants players
People from Baní
Arizona League Giants players
Clinton Giants players
Everett Giants players
Phoenix Firebirds players
San Jose Giants players
Shreveport Captains players